XHDCA-FM is a community radio station on 100.5 FM in Miahuatlán de Porfirio Díaz, Oaxaca. It is known as Estéreo Dinastia and owned by the civil association Colectivo Oaxaqueño para la Difusión de la Cultura y las Artes, A.C.

History
XHDCA began broadcasting as a pirate on 91.3 MHz. The station received its concession in December 2016, and in May 2018, 17 months later, it finally moved to its newly assigned frequency of 100.5.

References

Radio stations in Oaxaca
Community radio stations in Mexico
Former pirate radio stations
Radio stations established in 2018